The Ilocos Norte-class patrol boat is a series of four vessels in active service of the Philippine Coast Guard. Their hull number prefix "SARV" means they are classified as "search and rescue vessels".

Design and construction
Four vessels were delivered to the Philippine Coast Guard in December 2001. An option for a follow on order of ten more ships was offered by Tenix, but not used by the Philippine Coast Guard.

Tenix reused the Ilocos Norte design in 2008 for the New South Wales Police Force patrol vessel Nemesis; the largest police-operated patrol boat in the Southern Hermisphere.

Operational history

Thursday.

On April 8, 2013, BRP Romblon (SARV 3503) was deployed when a Chinese fishing vessel ran aground in Tubbataha Reef. Romblon assisted with removing the ship's cargo and fuel.

Ships in class

Gallery

References

Patrol vessels of the Philippines
Naval ships of the Philippines
Auxiliary search and rescue ship classes
Patrol boat classes